Charles A. Cummings, or Charles A. Comings, was a Michigan politician.

Political life
He was elected on April 2, 1900 as the Mayor of City of Flint for a single one-year term.

References

Mayors of Flint, Michigan
Michigan Democrats
20th-century American politicians